Champion of Lost Causes is a 1925 American silent mystery film directed by Chester Bennett and starring Edmund Lowe, Barbara Bedford, and Walter McGrail. A writer in search of a story visits a gambling club and witnesses a murder, which he attempts to solve.

Plot
As described in a film magazine review, Loring, an author, in getting material for a book, goes to a gambling den. He sees Wilbur, who acts strangely. He follows him and when Wilbur is killed, Peter Charles, father of Beatrice Charles, is accused of the murder. The gambler gives him a fictitious story about a murderous gang when Loring attempts to solve the murder mystery. Several attempts are made on his life by the gang but fail. The gambler proves to be Beatrice’s villainous fiancee, and when he confesses the murder Loring wins the young woman.

Cast
 Edmund Lowe as Loring 
 Barbara Bedford as Beatrice Charles 
 Walter McGrail as Zanten / Dick Sterling 
 Jack McDonald as Joseph Wilbur 
 Alec B. Francis as Peter Charles

Preservation
With no prints of Champion of Lost Causes located in any film archives, it is a lost film.

References

Bibliography
 Solomon, Aubrey. The Fox Film Corporation, 1915-1935: A History and Filmography. McFarland, 2011.

External links

 

1925 films
1925 mystery films
American silent feature films
American mystery films
Films directed by Chester Bennett
American black-and-white films
Fox Film films
1920s English-language films
1920s American films
Silent mystery films